Napadej Dhupatemiya, also written as Napadej Thupatemi, is a Thai air force officer. From 1 October 2021 to 30 September 2022, he served as commander-in-chief of the Royal Thai Air Force. Alongkorn Wannarot was appointed as his successor.

He previously served as chief advisor of Airbull Suttiwan (Commander of the Royal Thai Air Force from October 2020 to September 2021).

References 

Living people
Place of birth missing (living people)
Napadej Dhupatemiya
1962 births
Napadej Dhupatemiya